Inglot is a surname. Notable people with this surname include:
 Bill Inglot, American music engineer
 Dominic Inglot, English tennis player
 Jacek Inglot, Polish writer
 Stefan Inglot, Polish historian
 , Polish businessman, founder of Inglot Cosmetics

See also
Inglott
Englot
Inglett